Douglas Rosado (born 22 September 1964) is a Puerto Rican bobsledder. He competed at the 1992 Winter Olympics and the 1994 Winter Olympics.

References

1964 births
Living people
Puerto Rican male bobsledders
Olympic bobsledders of Puerto Rico
Bobsledders at the 1992 Winter Olympics
Bobsledders at the 1994 Winter Olympics
Sportspeople from San Juan, Puerto Rico
20th-century Puerto Rican people